Jens Holmboe (5 November 1752 – 4 December 1804) was a Norwegian bailiff. He is notable for his role in the settling of Målselvdalen.

Personal life
He was born in Lesja as the son of Hans Jenssen Holmboe (1721–1756) and Birgitte Marie Reinholtsdatter Ziegler (1723–1778).

In 1783 he married Anna Margrethe Irgens, who hailed from Tromsøe. The couple had twelve children. Their sons Even, Hans and Leonhard Christian became involved in politics. Their son Michael Wide Holmboe was the father of politician Jens Holmboe and businessman Hans Conrad Holmboe, grandfather of painter Thorolf Holmboe and great-grandfather of Ragnhild Rød and Charles Robertson.

Career
Holmboe worked as a bailiff (fogd) in Senja and Tromsøe between 1781 and 1800. He made a lasting mark in the region, as he organized settling in the Målselvdalen valley, in what would later become the municipalities of Målselv and Bardu. Farmers from the Gudbrand Valley and Østerdalen moved north mainly between 1791 and 1800, and Jens Holmboe helped about forty families with supplies and funding. Topographically, Målselvdalen was and is similar to Østerdalen.

He died in 1804 in Ervik in Trondenes. A bauta to commemorate him was raised there in 1964.

References

1752 births
1804 deaths
Norwegian civil servants
Jens
People from Lesja